Bruce Alva Gimbel (July 28, 1913 – October 1980) was an American businessman and president of the Gimbels department store.

Biography
Gimbel was born on July 28, 1913, to a Jewish family, the son of Alva (née Bernheimer) and Bernard Gimbel. He had four siblings: twins Peter Gimbel and David Gimbel; and twins Hope Gimbel and Caral Gimbel. His sister Hope was married and divorced from art collector David M. Solinger and mother of photographer Lynn Stern. His sister Caral was married and divorced from Edward Lasker, son of Albert Lasker; and baseball superstar Hank Greenberg before settling down with World War II hero Joseph M. Lebworth. In 1935, he graduated from Yale University. Gimbel ferried planes during World War II before working for the family company, the only child of Bernard to do so, as vice president of sales in 1946.

Career
Gimbel worked up through the ranks and in 1953, his father retired and he became president of Gimbels which had at the time over $300 million in sales 15 stores and 20,000 employees. Faced with declining sales at its downtown stores, he expanded the chain into the suburbs and using a newly established network of local buying offices in France, Italy, Spain, Germany and England, he stocked his stores with foreign manufactured copies of name brand merchandise. Both tactics worked for a time but facing the new economic reality, in 1965 he closed Saks Fifth Avenue's 34th street flagship store and soon after, in 1968, he forced his cousin, Adam Long Gimbel (husband of Sophie Gimbel), who operated the 31 store Saks Fifth Avenue chain, to retire. In 1972, he established a Gimbels store for $30 million on the Upper East Side thinking that he could capture the neighborhood's wealthy residents; the store was a failure. In July 1973, Gimbels was purchased for $205 million by Brown & Williamson Tobacco Corporation, the country's third‐largest tobacco company. He retired in 1975. In 1986, the Gimbels brand was retired.

Personal life
Gimbel married twice: first to Doris Asiel with whom he had a son, Robert B. Gimbel, and then to Barbara Poulson with whom he had a son, John B. Gimbel. He also adopted a daughter, Judith C. Gimbel, who married architect Benjamin Mendelsund, with whom she had a son, graphic artist Peter Mendelsund.

References

1913 births
1980 deaths
20th-century American Jews
Gimbel family
American retail chief executives
20th-century American businesspeople
Yale University alumni